Trapito is a 1975 Argentine comedy-drama adventure animated film directed by Manuel García Ferré.

Plot
During a stormy night, the sparrow Salapin is about to drown in a mud pool due to exhaustion. Next to the mud pool hangs Trapito, a scarecrow, on his frame. Trapito is a living scarecrow. He picks up Salapin and puts him in his inside pocket where it is dry and warm. 
The next morning, Trapito admits he is lonely and confused. Salapin takes him to see the Patriarch of the Birds (a wise old owl), who deduces that Trapito lacks imagination since he has been standing in a field all his life. The Patriarch advises him and Salapin to see the world.

They meet Larguirucho, a friendly but clumsy farmer mouse with many animals, mainly his pigs (a mother and her son). They go into town where Larguirucho sells his cheeses and treats them to a meal, but a crow named Ataúlfo steals his money. The innkeeper gives Larguirucho a week to pay for the meal or he will butcher the mother pig. Larguirucho can't find a job until he is hired as an assistant carpenter. A pirate orders a peg leg for his Captain Mala Pata, a black-bearded ruffian. After the peg leg is made, the carpenter wraps it up and hands it to Larguirucho for delivery. However, they make a quick stop at the butcher where Larguirucho accidentally mixes up the wrapped peg leg with a few similarly shaped packaged hams. Larguirucho delivers one of the hams to Mala Pata by mistake. Mala Pata then orders his sailors, including Ataúlfo, who results to be his first mate, to shanghai Larguirucho and use Trapito as their figurehead. Mala Pata sails for a tropical island where a map shows that valuable crystal tears are to be found. A mutiny for the tears, is accidentally foiled by Larguirucho, Salapin, and the little pig. Mala Pata makes Larguirucho first mate and frees Trapito.

At the island, Larguirucho and Trapito are ordered to dive and search the sea bottom for the crystal tears. They learn the tears are being wept by a mermaid, Espumita. She and all the fishes were happy until they were attacked by the Cruel Octopus, a pirate giant octopus, and his pirate crew of crabs and swordfishes. Espumita's boyfriend, the Sea Horse, becomes the good sea creatures’ general, and they are defeating the Cruel Octopus until the Sea Horse is captured. Larguirucho and Trapito rescue him, scare away the Cruel Octopus and are rewarded by one of Espumita's crystal tears. They return to the pirate ship, where Mala Pata and Ataúlfo dive into the sea after more tears but are chased away by the Cruel Octopus. Larguirucho, now the captain, sails back to town where he uses the crystal tear to pay the innkeeper. Larguirucho and his pigs return to the farm, while Salapin meets a female sparrow, and falls in love with her, and they fly off, abandoning Trapito. The lonely scarecrow returns to his field, but Salapin and his mate return the next year with their chicks, and Trapito and the chicks become playmates.

In some countries, mainly Argentina and Spain, the movie was accompanied by with an introduction of Petete, a puppet penguin similar to Topo Gigio, and one of the director's most famous characters, telling to the audience about the creation of the scarecrow.

Cast
Pelusa Suero
Enrique Conlazo
Marcelo Chimento
Susana Sisto
Norma Esteban
Mario Gian

External links
 

1975 films
1975 animated films
Argentine animated films
1970s Spanish-language films